Rambler is an automobile brand name that was first used by the Thomas B. Jeffery Company between 1900 and 1914.

Charles W. Nash bought Jeffery in 1916, and the name was reintroduced to the automobile marketplace by Nash Motors from 1950 through 1954. The "Rambler" trademark registration for use on automobiles and parts was issued on 9 March 1954 for Nash-Kelvinator.

Nash merged with the Hudson Motor Car Company to form American Motors Corporation (AMC) in 1954. The Rambler line of cars continued through the 1969 model year in the United States and 1983 in international markets.

Rambler cars were often nicknamed the "Kenosha Cadillac" after the original location and the largest place of manufacture in the city of Kenosha, Wisconsin.

Rambler 1897–1914

The first use of the name Rambler for an American-made automobile dates to 1897 when Thomas B. Jeffery of Chicago, Illinois and builder of the Rambler bicycle constructed his first prototype automobile.

After receiving positive reviews at the 1899 Chicago International Exhibition & Tournament and the first National Automobile Show in New York City, Jeffery decided to enter the automobile business. Following the sudden death of his Rambler partner, R. Philip Gormully, Jeffery sold their bicycle business to the American Bicycle Company, but retained rights to the Rambler name. In 1900, he bought the old Sterling Bicycle Co. factory in Kenosha, Wisconsin, and set up shop.

Thomas Jeffery and his son Charles, experimented with such early technical innovations as a steering wheel (as opposed to a tiller), left-hand driving and the engine placement under a hood instead of under the seat, but it was decided that such features were too advanced for the motoring public of the day. The first Ramblers were tiller-steered, right-hand drive and the single-cylinder engine was placed under the seat. Rambler innovated various design features and was the first to equip cars with a spare wheel-and-tire assembly. This allowed the driver, when experiencing a flat tire, to exchange the spare wheel and tire for the flat one, rather than patching.

Jeffery started commercially mass-producing automobiles in 1902 and by the end of the year had produced 1,500 motor cars, priced at $750, one-sixth of all cars that were manufactured in the U.S. during that year. The Thomas B. Jeffery Company was the second largest auto manufacturer at that time, behind Oldsmobile.

In 1904 Jeffery built 2,342 Ramblers. Higher-powered two-cylinder versions with front-mounted engines and steering wheels were now available. In 1905 the single-cylinder was discontinued and three larger two-cylinder models priced from $1,200 to $3,000 were offered. A Rambler four-cylinder was introduced in 1906.

New employee Edward S, Jordan, who would later become Jeffery's secretary and general manager, provided advertisement copy such as "The Right Car at the Right Price," and “June Time Is Rambler Time” and other evocative phrases. By 1906, Rambler was considered an industry leader with one of the best-equipped automobile factories. Thomas Jeffery was not interested in major mass production and settled in a pattern of producing 2,500 Ramblers a year.

In 1910 all Ramblers were now four-cylinder medium-priced cars. While on vacation in 1910, Thomas B. Jeffery died of a heart attack and his son Charles took over the newly incorporated Thomas B. Jeffery Company. Charles increased annual production by about 500 cars and for 1912 introduced new Ned Jordan model names such as Cross Country, Country Club, Knickerbocker, and Valkyrie. For 1913 the last Rambler branded models were the Cross Country roadster and touring car, an Inside Drive coupe and the Gotham Limousine, priced from $1,650 to $2,750, . 

In 1914, Charles T. Jeffery, Thomas B. Jeffery's son, replaced the Rambler brand name with Jeffery in honor of his now-deceased father.

In 1916, the Thomas B. Jeffery Company was purchased by Charles W. Nash and became Nash Motors Company in 1917. The Jeffery brand name was dropped at the time of the sale and the manufacture of Nash branded automobiles commenced. In 1937, the concern became the Nash-Kelvinator Corporation through a merger with the major appliance maker.

Rambler 1950–1957

Under the direction of Charles Nash's successor George W. Mason, Nash-Kelvinator Corporation began the development of a small car that could be produced inexpensively for the post-World War II economy. However, steel shortages limited the amount of raw materials that Nash could obtain, so Mason developed a compact car that featured a unique convertible design and featured many standard features that were typically options on other cars. This approach maximized profits for the company. Nash-Kelvinator trademarked Rambler in 1950, the same maneplate as was used by its predecessor company in the early 1900s.

When introduced, the Rambler was an immediate success for Nash. As steel quotas related to the Korean War eased, the Rambler line was broadened in both its model types, first a station wagon and 2-door hardtop dubbed "Country Club", and later a 2-door sedan. A further expansion of the line for 1954 included a four-door sedan and station wagon called "Cross Country" on a stretched wheelbase, which proved to be as successful as the first generation of two-door sedan convertibles.

The first generation of modern Ramblers carried a modified version of Nash's Airflyte styling, which included closed wheel openings. While the wheel openings of any car are a major source of wind resistance, the design was rather primarily an engineering design to increase the strength of the car for impact resistance. Many people surmised that the skirted fenders limited the turning radius of the wheels, but they were not an actual handicap for having a comparatively narrow front track. Ramblers continued to use this styling until 1955, when the front wheels were revealed by a periodic design update.

In 1954 the Rambler offered the first combination heating and air conditioning unit available on American cars. The unit could be an add-on or could be installed at the factory for $395, which at that time was about the lowest-cost unit available in an American car.

In 1954, American Motors Corporation (AMC) was formed from the merger of Nash-Kelvinator and the Hudson Motor Car Company. Following the merger, 1955 and 1956 Ramblers were badged as both Nashes and Hudsons, with no visible difference between the two. Rambler became a marque in its own right for the 1957 model year. The Nash and Hudson makes were continued as a "senior" model only through 1957, after which all of AMC's offerings were marketed as Ramblers, with the exception of the imported 1958–1962 Metropolitan.

Rambler 1958–1969

At the start of the 1960s George Romney made a marketing decision that more fully unified the various Rambler model names under the Rambler brand. In 1962, the Ambassador, a top-trim level model, was officially brought under the Rambler name (it had previously been named the "Ambassador by Rambler"), and the former Rambler Six and Rambler Rebel V8 were renamed the Rambler Classic. While the top-line models for 1958-1961 were advertised as the "Ambassador V-8 by Rambler", on the cars themselves the nomenclature was "Rambler Ambassador"

In 1958, AMC introduced America's first "compact car," the Rambler American. This car was essentially the 1950 Nash Rambler, slightly restyled and modernized for the late 1950s. However, the car was an instant success and lost sales only after the "Big Three" (GM, Ford, and Chrysler) each introduced compact cars of their own (GM "X" body, Ford Falcon, and Chrysler A platform).

Romney also put into play his plan to slash production costs, which involved more common parts sharing between the Ambassador and Classic models. Beginning in 1962, all "senior" Rambler models would share the same automobile platform with identical wheelbase and body parts, but the engines, trims, and equipment levels distinguished the Classic from the Ambassador. The Rambler's compact size (by US standards) also made it an international competitor, and between 1961 and 1965 AMC opened thirteen foreign assembly plants, from Costa Rica to the Philippines.

In 1963, the entire Rambler line received the Motor Trend Car of the Year award. However, Romney's departure to become Michigan governor opened the door for his successor, Roy Abernethy, to redirect the company towards a strategy of competing head to head with the Big Three (General Motors, Chrysler Corporation, and Ford Motor Company) with a variety of bodies and automobile platforms. This new plan also included marketing the various models apart from the Rambler brand name, which Abernethy felt would be a hindrance in the market segments he hoped to pursue.

One of the first moves in that direction was the creation of the 1965 line of Ramblers, which split the Classic from the Ambassador visually, while still sharing a significant number of parts. Once again the Ambassador had a unique, extended wheelbase. In addition, AMC introduced the Marlin, a hardtop fastback intended to enter AMC in the youth and personal luxury market segments as well as also positioning it as a "halo" vehicle.

AMC chief stylist Richard Teague introduced a totally restyled and attractive Rambler American in 1964, which was a sales success. This basic body remained in its original shape through 1969.

Backed by marketing reports, Abernethy next made a persuasive argument to the AMC board that the Rambler name had not only acquired a stodgy image and was a hindrance to increasing sales, but that consumers associated it with compact cars. In what hindsight would show to be an ill-conceived decision, American Motors began to phase it out in favor of an AMC marque beginning in 1966, as it attempted to become a multiplatform automobile manufacturer.

By 1968, the only vehicle produced by AMC to carry the Rambler marque was the compact Rambler American. Although designed as a "basic" economy car, the American spawned the audacious SC/Rambler, developed with Hurst Performance. While AMC planned to produce only 500 for the 1969 model year, the "Scrambler" proved popular so two more groups of about 500 each were built. All featured the same  V8, four-barrel carburetor, and close-ratio four-speed transmission of the AMX, plus Hurst shifter, Twin-Grip (limited slip) differential, and cold air hood.

For the final year in 1969, the models were simply called Rambler. The 1969 Rambler (and Chevrolet Corvair and Dodge Dart) were the only U.S. compact cars available that year in a two-door hardtop body style; Ford compacts were only available as sedans.

The last U.S.-built Rambler, of over 4.2 million cars that carried the Rambler name that rolled off the assembly line in Kenosha, was produced on 30 June 1969.

Rambler 1970–1983
The Rambler marque was continued in all international markets after it was dropped in the United States. AMC vehicles were badged as “Rambler" in Argentina, Australia, Chile, Costa Rica, Mexico, New Zealand, Peru, Philippines, Venezuela, South Africa, and the United Kingdom. In Argentina, a special model based on the third-generation Rambler American became the IKA Torino in 1967. It later was named the Renault Torino and was offered until 1981. The Rambler nameplate was last used on automobiles in 1983 by Vehículos Automotores Mexicanos (VAM) in Mexico.

Rambler brand cars
Historic:
 Rambler: 1901–1913
Compact:
 Rambler American: 1958–1968
 Rambler 1969
Mid-sized:
 Rambler Six and V8: 1957–1960
 Rambler Rebel: 1957–1960
 Rambler Ambassador: 1958–1965
 Rambler Classic: 1961–1966
 Rambler Typhoon: 1964
 Rambler Rebel: 1967
 Rambler Marlin: 1965
Show cars:
 Rambler Palm Beach: 1950
 Rambler Tarpon: 1964
International:
 Rambler Ambassador 
 Costa Rica 1965-1970 
 United Kingdom 1965-1974
 Rambler AMX 
 Australia 1969–1970 
 Rambler Hornet 
 Australia 1970–1975 
 Costa Rica 1970-1975 (as "Rambler SST" and "Rambler Unisex") 
 Mexico 1970-1977 (as "VAM American" and "Rambler American") 
 South Africa 1970-1971
 Venezuela 1970-1977
 Rambler Javelin 
 Australia 1968–1973 
 Germany 1968-1970 
 Mexico 1968-1973 
 Venezuela 1968-1974
 Philippines 1968–1970. 
 Rambler Matador 
 Australia 1971–1977
 Costa Rica 1971-1974
 Mexico 1971-1976 (as "Rambler Classic")
 United Kingdom 1971-1977
 Rambler Rebel 
 Australia 1967–1971 
 Belgium 1967 (as "Renault Rambler") 
 Costa Rica 1967-1970
 Mexico 1967-1970 (as "Rambler Classic")
 New Zealand 1967-1971 
 United Kingdom 1967-1970

International production

Companies that undertook the production of Rambler vehicles outside of the United States either by local assembly or full import included the following:

North America
 Vehículos Automotores Mexicanos (Mexico): 1963–1983
 Purdy Motor (Costa Rica): 1964-1973
 Motorizada de Costa Rica (Costa Rica): 1974-1978 
 Nassau Motors (Bahamas): 196?-197? 

Australasia
 Australian Motor Industries (Australia): 1960–1977
 VW Motors Ltd (New Zealand): 1958-1962
 Campbell Motor Industries (New Zealand): 1964–1971
 Luzon Machineries Limited (Philippines): 196?-1970

Europe
 Renault (France/Belgium): 1962-1967
 Jacques Poch (France): 1970s
 Jean-Charles (France): 1970s
 Nash Concessionaires Ltd (United Kingdom): 19??-1960 
 Petrol Motor Power Co. (United Kingdom): 1902-1912
 Rambler Motors (A.M.C) Limited (United Kingdom): 1961-1977 
 Peter Lindner GmbH (Germany) 1969-1977
 Wilhelm Karmann GmbH (Germany): 1968-1970
 Kolberg & Caspary AS (Norway): 1958-19??

South America
 Automovil de Francia (Venezuela): 1963-1968
 Constructora Venezolana de Vehículos (Venezuela): 1968–1977
 Industrias Kaiser Argentina (Argentina): 1962–1972
 Juan Carlos Lutteral (Argentina) 1979-198?
 Indauto (Chile): 1964-1967
 Automotores Franco Chilena (Chile) 1967-19??
 Rambler del Peru S.A (Peru): 1963-1966
 Industria Automotriz Peruana S.A (Peru): 1966-1970 

Africa
 National Motor Assemblers (South Africa): 1964-1967
 Rosslyn Motor Assemblers (South Africa): 1968
 Motor Assemblies Limited (South Africa): 1969-1970 

Middle East
 Pars Khodro (Iran): 1967-1974

Trademark
American Motors stopped producing cars using the Rambler trademark in 1970. In 1973, Action Age Incorporated wanted to register "Scrambler" for an off-highway vehicle and in a case before the Trademark Trial and Appeal Board contended that the trademark Rambler had been abandoned. This registration was opposed by AMC and the court determined that even though the manufacturing of Ramblers ended, the trademark was not abandoned because AMC continued to have commercial activities such as parts with the Rambler name on the boxes as well as franchising dealers that retained Rambler in their name or marketed used cars under the Rambler trademark./

The Rambler trademark registration expired on 12 December 1994, because Chrysler (the company that acquired AMC in 1987) did not file an affidavit of continued use. However, it was claimed by Chrysler as a retro or heritage mark that "had built an affinity and emotional connection with the consumer as a result of the original product that was in the marketplace, and continues to have nostalgia appeal with consumers who are still interested in acquiring products built around the mark’s core values and replicates the markets and the mark itself." In a 2008 case before the Trademark Trial and Appeal Board, the United States Patent and Trademark Office determined that Chrysler continued to have products licensed in connection with the Rambler mark for automobiles and thus sufficiently related to automobiles so that consumers would ascribe a single source to the products. Chrysler, as the successor company, was able to "prove non-abandonment by demonstrating that there were many Rambler cars (and related supplies) bearing the mark still in use. The board ruled that Chrysler "has priority of use, at the very least with respect to key rings, calendars, decals, specification sheets and owner's manuals, all relating to Rambler automobiles."

References

External links 
 The AMC Rambler Car Club
 Rambler History on amcrc.com
 Ramblers at ConceptCarz

Rambler vehicles
1900s cars
1910s cars
1950s cars
1960s cars
AMC vehicles
Brass Era vehicles
Veteran vehicles
Cars introduced in 1900
Cars introduced in 1950
Cars of the United States
Compact cars
Defunct motor vehicle manufacturers of the United States
George W. Romney
Motor vehicle manufacturers based in Michigan
Motor vehicle manufacturers based in Wisconsin
Motor vehicles manufactured in the United States
Nash vehicles
Rear-wheel-drive vehicles
Sedans
Station wagons
Defunct manufacturing companies based in Michigan
Defunct manufacturing companies based in Wisconsin
Companies based in Kenosha, Wisconsin